The 2013–14 Biathlon World Cup – World Cup 5 was held in Ruhpolding, Germany, from January 8 until January 12, 2014.

Schedule of events

Medal winners

Men

Women

Achievements

 Best performance for all time

 , 17th place in Individual
 , 31st place in Individual
 , 54th place in Individual
 , 4th place in Individual
 , 4th place in Pursuit
 , 9th place in Individual
 , 13th place in Individual
 , 24th place in Individual
 , 36th place in Individual
 , 43rd place in Individual
 , 46th place in Individual
 , 75th place in Individual

References 

2013–14 Biathlon World Cup
Biathlon World Cup
January 2014 sports events in Europe
2014 in Bavaria
Biathlon competitions in Germany
Sports competitions in Bavaria